Pudupatti is a panchayat town in Virudhunagar district in the Indian state of Tamil Nadu.

Geography

A.Pudupatti is a village located down south of India in Tamil Nadu state.

The initial ‘A’ implies from neighboring village ‘Appayanayakkan patti’ just to get differentiated from many other Pudupatties in the state.

Education
The town has ‘Panchayat Union Middle School’ and 'Kamrajar aramba padasalai' in Pudupatti and ‘Government Higher Secondary School’ in neighboring village Veerarpatti.

Economy
Pudupatti is basically an agriculture based village. As it happened to many other villages in the state (as rainfall had dropped too low), people who were dependent on agriculture had migrated to other places for their survival.

Demographics
 India census, Pudupatti had a population of 7846. Males constitute 49% of the population and females 51%. Pudupatti has an average literacy rate of 60%, higher than the national average of 59.5%: male literacy is 70%, and female literacy is 50%. In Pudupatti, 12% of the population is under 6 years of age.

References

External links

Cities and towns in Virudhunagar district